The West Palm Beach Indians were a minor league baseball team based in West Palm Beach, Florida. The team played its home games at Connie Mack Field.

History
Through its existence, the Indians were mostly an independent team playing in the Florida East Coast League from 1940 to 1942, the Florida International League from 1946 to 1954, and the Florida State League in 1955. In between, they were affiliated with the Philadelphia Athletics in 1950, Havana Sugar Kings in 1954, and Milwaukee Braves in 1955.

In 1956, the franchise name was changed to the West Palm Beach Sun Chiefs an affiliate of the Cincinnati Redlegs. Managed by Walt Novick, the 1965 team posted an 81–58 record to finish in third place,  games out of the first place spot. The team included on its roster future big leaguers as Dave Bristol, Duane Richards and Cookie Rojas. The franchise but did not return for the 1957 season.

West Palm Beach was without a professional team until 1965, when the West Palm Beach Braves joined the Florida State League as an affiliate of the Milwaukee Braves.

The ballpark

West Palm Beach teams played home minor league games at Connie Mack Field. The ballpark was located at the intersection of Tamarind Avenue and Okeechobee Boulevard. It was demolished in 1992 and a parking garage for the Raymond F. Kravis Center for the Performing Arts occupies the site today.

Notable alumni

 Dave Bristol (1956)
 Lou Finney (1949) MLB All-Star
 Claude Raymond (1955) MLB All-Star
 Cookie Rojas (1956) 5 x MLB All-Star

Year–by–year records

Sources

Defunct minor league baseball teams
Baseball teams established in 1940
Defunct Florida State League teams
Cincinnati Reds minor league affiliates
Philadelphia Athletics minor league affiliates
1940 establishments in Florida
1956 disestablishments in Florida
Defunct baseball teams in Florida
Baseball teams disestablished in 1956
Sports in West Palm Beach, Florida
Milwaukee Braves minor league affiliates